is the second single of Morning Musume's tenth anniversary team Morning Musume Tanjō 10nen Kinentai. It was released on August 8, 2007, while the Single V DVD was released on [August 22].

The CD single had two editions. A limited edition which contained a bonus DVD and the regular edition containing one photocard that was only available on its first press.
A Single V was also released.

It reached number 15 on the Oricon Charts in Japan.

Track listings

CD single 

"Itoshiki Tomo e" (Instrumental)

Single V DVD 
"Itoshiki Tomo e"
"Itoshiki Tomo e" (5-shot Version)

Musical personnel 
Kaori Iida – vocals
Natsumi Abe – vocals
Maki Goto – vocals, chorus
Risa Niigaki – vocals, chorus
Koharu Kusumi – vocal

Itoshiki Tomo e 
 – lyricist
 – composer and guitar (courtesy of Vermillion Records)
 – arrangement, programming, and guitar
 – arrangement, programming, and keyboards
 – bass
Jun Aoyama – drums
 – saxophone (courtesy of Zain Records)

Michi Naru Mirai e 
 – lyricist, composer, guitar, and chorus
Daisuke Ikeda – arrangement, programming, and keyboards
 – arrangement, programming, and guitar
 – bass and chorus
Jun Aoyama – drums

Performances 
2007-08-03 – Music Japan
2007-08-12 – Haromoni@
2007-08-25 – Melodix

References

External links 
"Itoshiki Tomo e" entries on the Up-Front Works official website: CD entry, DVD entry

Morning Musume songs
Zetima Records singles
2007 singles
Song recordings produced by Tsunku
Japanese-language songs